The Best of Talking Heads is a greatest hits album by American rock band Talking Heads, released on August 17, 2004 by Sire, Warner Bros. Records, and Rhino Entertainment.

Track listing

Personnel 
 David Byrne – lead vocals, guitar
 Jerry Harrison – keyboards, guitar, backing vocal
 Chris Frantz – drums, backing vocals
 Tina Weymouth – bass, backing vocals

Charts

References

2004 greatest hits albums
Albums produced by Brian Eno
Albums produced by Steve Lillywhite
Albums produced by Tony Bongiovi
Albums produced by Jerry Harrison
Albums produced by David Byrne
Rhino Records compilation albums
Talking Heads compilation albums
Sire Records compilation albums
Warner Records compilation albums